The 2006 United States Senate elections were held on November 7, 2006, with all 33 Class 1 Senate seats being contested. The term of office for those elected in 2006 ran from January 3, 2007, to January 3, 2013. Prior to the election, the Republican Party controlled 55 of the 100 Senate seats.

The Senate elections were part of the Democratic sweep during the 2006 elections, in which Democrats made numerous gains and no congressional or gubernatorial seat held by a Democrat was won by a Republican. However, Democratic incumbent Joe Lieberman in Connecticut was defeated in the primary and was later reelected as a third party candidate; he continued to caucus with the Democrats. Because of this, this is the first time since 1970 in which a member of a third party, who is not an independent, was elected to the Senate. Independent Jim Jeffords in Vermont retired but was succeeded by another Independent, Bernie Sanders, retaining their presence in the Senate. Jeffords and Sanders both caucused with Democrats. Democrats picked up six seats, all via the defeats of incumbents, in Missouri, Montana, Pennsylvania, Ohio, Rhode Island, and Virginia; while holding open seats in Maryland and Minnesota. Republicans held their sole open seat in Tennessee.

Following the elections, no party held a majority of seats for the first time since January 1955. The Democrats were able to control the chamber because the two Independents caucused with the Democrats. They needed at least 51 seats to control the Senate because Vice President Dick Cheney would have broken any 50–50 tie in favor of the Republicans. This was the only time between 1990 and 2022 that Democrats gained Senate seats in a midterm.

, this was the last time Democrats won a Senate election in Nebraska and the last time they did not win a seat in Connecticut.

Results summary 

Summary of the November 7, 2006, United States Senate election results

Sources:
 Dave Leip's Atlas of U.S. Elections
 United States Elections Project at George Mason University

Change in composition

Before the elections

After the elections

Final pre-election predictions

Race summary

Special elections during the 109th Congress 
There were no special elections during the 109th Congress.

Elections leading to the next Congress 
In these general elections, the winners were elected for the term beginning January 3, 2007; ordered by state.

All of the elections involved the Class 1 seats.

Closest races 

In eight races the margin of victory was under 10%.

Gains and losses

Retirements
Two Democrats, one Republican, and one Independent retired rather than seek re-election.

Defeats
Six Republicans and one Democrat sought re-election but lost in the primary or general election.

Arizona 

Incumbent Republican Jon Kyl won re-election to a third term over Democrat Jim Pederson, real estate developer and former Chairman of the Arizona Democratic Party.

The incumbent, Republican Jon Kyl, was elected to the Senate in 1994 and was re-elected to a second term in 2000; having previously spent eight years in the U.S. House of Representatives. Kyl's Democratic opponent for the general election was wealthy real-estate developer Jim Pederson, who served as the Arizona Democratic Party Chairman from 2001 to 2005. During his tenure, Pederson spent millions of dollars of his own money to help Democrats modernize and to elect Janet Napolitano as Governor of Arizona. The deadline for signing petition signatures to appear on the September 12, 2006 primary ballot was June 14, 2006.

Not long after the 2004 election, Pederson's name began being mentioned as a potential Senate candidate for the 2006 race. On July 28, 2005, Pederson formally stepped down as Chairman of the Arizona Democratic Party, further fueling those speculations. In early September 2005, an e-mail was sent from the Arizona Democratic Party's website, inviting people to an announcement by Pederson on September 7. In an anticlimactic move, an e-mail was sent out shortly after the first saying that the announcement would be postponed due to Hurricane Katrina. It was requested that any money that would be donated to Pederson's campaign at the announcement be directed to relief efforts instead. Similarly, a meeting in Arizona of the Democratic National Committee (DNC) was scheduled for around the same time. It was also postponed and the same request was made involving donations. On September 7, 2005, Pederson filed to run for the U.S. Senate. On September 14, 2005, Pederson formally announced his intention to run, in his hometown of Casa Grande, Arizona.

Although Kyl started the campaign with a sizable lead in most polls, the gap quickly narrowed, especially after Pederson released his array of ads.

Pederson lost the election by 9.84% or 150,257 votes, despite Democratic Incumbent Governor Janet Napolitano easily being re-elected and winning every county statewide. While Pederson lost it was still notable, as it was the worst performance of Senator Kyl's career. Kyl did well as Republicans usually do in Maricopa County home of Phoenix. Pederson did well in Pima County home of Tucson which tends to support Democrats. Kyl was called the winner by CNN at around 8 P.M. local time, 11 P.M. EST. Pederson called Senator Kyl and conceded defeat at 9:02 P.M. local time, 12:02 P.M. EST.

California 

Incumbent Democrat Dianne Feinstein won re-election to her third full term.

Feinstein stood against Republican Dick Mountjoy, who had never held a statewide elected position, but had been a state senator for several years. Also running was Libertarian Michael Metti, Don Grundmann of the American Independent Party, Todd Chretien of the Green Party and Marsha Feinland of the Peace and Freedom Party.

Because California is a state that requires a large amount of money to wage a competitive statewide campaign, it is not unusual - as was the case for this race - for a popular incumbent to have no significant opponent. Several prominent Republicans, such as Bill Jones, Matt Fong, and others, declined to run, and a previous announced challenger, businessman Bill Mundell, withdrew his declaration after determining he would not be a self-funded candidate (like Michael Huffington was in the 1994 election).

On September 22, the Los Angeles Times reported that Mountjoy's official biography, as found on his campaign website, falsely asserted that he had served aboard the battleship USS Missouri during the Korean War—he'd actually served aboard the heavy cruiser USS Bremerton. A review of the ships' logs corroborated this and the website was quickly changed to reflect his service aboard the Bremerton rather than the Missouri. Mountjoy denied having been responsible for adding the incorrect information

Feinstein won the election easily. Feinstein won almost every major urban area, winning in Los Angeles, San Francisco, Sacramento, and San Diego. Feinstein was projected the winner as the polls closed at 11 P.M. EST.

Connecticut 

Incumbent Democrat Joe Lieberman lost the August 8 Democratic primary to cable executive Ned Lamont, a former Greenwich selectman. Lieberman formed his own third party and won in the general election to a fourth term.

Because Connecticut was believed to be a Democratic stronghold, Connecticut's Senate seat was considered safe to remain as a Democratic seat by political analysts, but Lieberman's continued support for conservative and Bush administration policies made him vulnerable to a Democratic primary challenger. Lieberman's critics objected to what they call Lieberman's lack of commitment to the Democratic party; his opposition to affirmative action; his opposition to a Connecticut state law that would require Catholic hospitals to provide emergency contraception to rape victims; his membership in the bipartisan Gang of 14; his support of Florida governor Jeb Bush in the Terri Schiavo case; his initial willingness to compromise on Social Security privatization; his alliances with Republicans; and his attacks on other Democrats.

On March 13, 2006, Ned Lamont announced his candidacy for the Democratic nomination. Lamont was more liberal than Lieberman, but he was not immune from criticism from within his own party. The New Republic senior editor and "liberal hawk" Jonathan Chait criticized Lamont's supporters by comparing them to activists who he felt "tore the party apart" in the 1960s and 70s.

Early polling showed Lieberman with as much as a 46-point lead, but subsequent polls showed Lamont gaining until Lamont took the lead just weeks before the primary. A controversy about a "kiss" Lieberman supposedly received from President Bush during the 2005 State of the Union address highlighted concerns that the senator was too close to the unpopular president to be a credible Democratic nominee. Lieberman released several campaign advertisements over the summer of 2006, seeking to connect himself to former President Bill Clinton and to portray Lamont as standing for little more than opposition to Lieberman. Lamont struck back against some of Lieberman's more negative ads with an advertisement produced by well-known political consultant Bill Hillsman. In Lamont's ad, a foreboding narrator says, "Meet Ned Lamont. He can't make a decent cup of coffee, he's a bad karaoke singer, and he has a messy desk." Lamont then chimes in, "Aren't you sick of political attack ads that insult your intelligence? Senator Lieberman, let's stick to issues and pledge to support whoever wins the Democratic primary."

From midmorning August 7 to well past August 9, Lieberman's official campaign site was taken offline; officials from Lieberman's campaign claimed "dirty politics" and "Rovian tactics" on the part of Lamont's supporters, and more specifically, a sustained Distributed Denial of Service attack that, according to the Lieberman campaign, had left the site down for several days.

Tim Tagaris, Lamont's Internet communications director, denied the charge and attributed the downtime to the fact that the Lieberman campaign had chosen an inferior web host, or ISP, and was only paying $15/month to operate its site (in comparison to the $1500/month being spent by the Lamont campaign). On December 20, 2006, a joint investigation by Connecticut Attorney General Richard Blumenthal's office and the U.S. attorney's office cleared the Lamont campaign of the hacking accusations. A spokesman for Kevin O'Connor, the U.S. Attorney for Connecticut, stated, "The investigation has revealed no evidence the problems the Web site experienced were the result of criminal conduct."

Lamont won the primary with 51.79% of the vote, as opposed to Lieberman's 48.21%. However, in his concession speech, Lieberman announced that he would stand by his prior statements that he'd run as an independent if he lost the Democratic primary.

In the Republican Party primary, Alan Schlesinger drew fire in July when it was revealed that he had been gambling under an alias in order to avoid detection as a card counter. Despite calls to withdraw from the race, Schlesinger remained in the race, ultimately becoming the Republican nominee when no other Republican challengers entered the race.

On June 12, Ned Lamont began running radio ads promising if he lost the primary to endorse Lieberman, challenging Lieberman to abandon consideration of an independent run by making a similar pledge. Lieberman refused to make this pledge; his campaign manager, Sean Smith said, "Are we going to support Ned Lamont?  Ah, no!"

On July 3 in Hartford, Lieberman announced that he would collect signatures in order to guarantee himself a position on the November ballot. Both Lieberman and Smith said that Lieberman will run as a "petitioning Democrat" and would caucus with Senate Democrats if elected. On July 10, the Lieberman campaign officially filed paperwork allowing him to collect signatures to form a new political party, the Connecticut for Lieberman party.

Upon Lieberman's announcement, independent polls continued to show him favored to win a plurality or outright majority of the vote in a three-way general election (see below). The petition issue led to charges against the Lieberman campaign of political opportunism and lack of respect for the political process. Lieberman received strong support from many prominent conservative pundits and publications. "[H]is most vocal support came from places like The Weekly Standard, National Review, and Commentary Magazine; Sean Hannity, Bill Kristol and right-wing radio hosts cheered for his victory." Thus, "Lieberman was able to run in the general election as the de facto Republican candidate — every major Republican office-holder in the state endorsed him — and to supplement that GOP base with strong support from independents."

On August 9, Democratic Senate Minority Leader Harry Reid and DSCC Chair Chuck Schumer issued the following joint statement on the Connecticut Senate race:

According to The Hill, a Democratic aide to a high-ranking senator commented that Lieberman might be stripped of his Democratic privileges in the Senate. "At this point Lieberman cannot expect to just keep his seniority," said the aide. "He can't run against a Democrat and expect to waltz back to the caucus with the same seniority as before. It would give the view that the Senate is a country club rather than representative of a political party and political movement."

Lieberman won with approximately 50% of the vote, and served a six-year term from January 3, 2007 to January 3, 2013. Exit polls showed that Lieberman won the vote of 33% of Democrats, 54% of independents and 70% of Republicans. Lieberman won every county in the November general election.

Delaware 

Incumbent Democrat Thomas R. Carper won re-election to a second term over a Republican Temple University law professor, Jan C. Ting.

Florida 

Incumbent Democrat Bill Nelson won re-election to a second term over Republican congresswoman Katherine Harris.

The organization Citizens for Responsibility and Ethics in Washington, which monitors political corruption, complained to the Federal Elections Commission (FEC) in October 2006 that the Bacardi beverage company had illegally used corporate resources in support of a fundraising event for Nelson in 2005. CREW had previously filed a similar complaint concerning a Bacardi fundraising event for Republican Senator Mel Martinez, an event that raised as much as $60,000 for Martinez's campaign. The amended complaint alleged that, on both occasions, Bacardi violated the Federal Election Campaign Act and FEC regulations by soliciting contributions from a list of the corporation's vendors.

Nelson was easily re-elected, winning all but 10 of Florida's 67 counties and receiving 60.3% of the vote, winning by 1,064,421 votes or 22.2%. Nelson was projected the winner as the polls closed at 7 P.M. EST.

Hawaii 

Incumbent Democrat Daniel Akaka won re-election to his third full term over Republican State Representative Cynthia Thielen.

Democratic congressman Ed Case ran against Akaka in the Democratic Primary, having stated that although he had the deepest respect for Akaka, Hawaii was in a time of transition with regard to the state's representation in Congress which required that the state elect Senators of the next generation to provide continuity. He warned the state would lose all clout in Washington if the state's two US Senators, both of whom were over 80 years old, left office within a short time of each other. If a Senator were to die, Hawaii election law requires that the governor appoint a replacement of the same party.

Hawaii's other Representative, Neil Abercrombie, and other Senator, Daniel Inouye, pledged their support to Akaka, who won the primary with 55% of the vote.

Hawaii State Representative Cynthia Thielen was selected to be the Republican nominee after Jerry Coffee, who had previously withdrawn his candidacy, won the primary. Akaka won in all 4 Hawaii counties, taking at least 60% of the vote in each area.

Indiana 

Incumbent Republican Richard Lugar was unopposed by any Democratic candidate and was re-elected to his sixth six-year term with 87.3% of the vote over Libertarian radio operator Steve Osborn. This would be Lugar's last race of his political career.

Lugar faced no opposition from the Democratic Party, as they felt Lugar was unbeatable. The Indiana Senate race was the only one in 2006 where the incumbent faced no challenger from the other major party. Also running was Libertarian Steve Osborn. Osborn was from La Porte, Indiana and was an amateur radio operator. Exit polls projected a landslide victory for Lugar which was borne out by the result.

The election was not close, with Lugar winning every county. Osborn's best performance was in Switzerland County, where he received just over 22% of the vote.

Maine 

Incumbent Republican Olympia Snowe won re-election to a third term over Democratic activist Jean Hay Bright.

Snowe, who had been elected to both of her previous terms by approximately 2-to-1 margins, had never lost an election. Snowe won by a landslide even as Democrats won across the country due to her being a centrist Republican and having a very high approval rating in Maine. Meanwhile, her Democratic opponent in the 2006 election, Jean Hay Bright, had never been elected to political office.

Democrats' best hope for taking the seat was that Snowe would retire rather than run in 2006, but there was never any indication that she seriously considered not running for re-election.

The filing deadline for major party candidates was March 15, 2006. The primary was held June 13, 2006. Olympia Snowe was unopposed for the Republican nomination; Jean Hay Bright narrowly won the Democratic nod with 50.7% of the vote against Eric Mehnert.

Hay Bright announced her candidacy in May 2005. Hay Bright was previously an unsuccessful candidate for the Democratic nomination to the House in 1994 and the Senate in 1996.

The race had been called by FOX News for Snowe 23 minutes after the polls had closed. Snowe won re-election by a greater margin than any U.S. Senator that cycle except Indiana's Richard Lugar, who faced only a Libertarian opponent. Snowe won in all of Maine's counties, taking at least 60% of the vote in each region.

Maryland 

Incumbent Democrat Paul Sarbanes, Maryland's longest serving United States senator, decided to retire instead of seeking a sixth term. Democratic nominee Ben Cardin won the open seat.

Kweisi Mfume, a former congressman and NAACP President, was the first to announce for the position, in March 2005. Ben Cardin, then a congressman since 1987, was the only other major candidate until September 2005, when Dennis F. Rasmussen, a former Baltimore County Executive, American University professor Allan Lichtman, and wealthy Potomac businessman Josh Rales entered the contest. Thirteen other candidates subsequently also entered the primary. As of August 2006, Cardin had raised more than $4.8 million and collected endorsements from a number of Democratic politicians, the AFL–CIO, and The Washington Post; Mfume had raised over $1.2 million and collected endorsements from the Maryland State Teachers Association, Progressive Maryland, former Maryland Governor Parris Glendening, the National Organization for Women, and Maryland Congressmen Elijah Cummings and Al Wynn.

Michael S. Steele, Lieutenant Governor and former Chairman of the Maryland Republican Party, was expected to win the Republican primary, and the Baltimore Sun wrote the month before that he faced "only nominal opposition". Among a field of nine other candidates, the only Republican receiving significant media coverage was Daniel Vovak.

This was Maryland's first open Senate seat since 1986, when Senator Barbara Mikulski was first elected.

Kevin Zeese, the nominee for the Green, Populist and Libertarian Parties, was also on the ballot.

Though Steele lost the general election by 10% of the vote, a much wider margin than predicted, his was and remains the best showing for a Republican in a Senate race in Maryland since Charles Mathias, Jr. was re-elected in 1980 with 66% of the vote.

Both Steele and Cardin made controversial statements and advertising throughout the campaign.

Cardin primarily attacked Steele over his close relations with President Bush, including pictures of Bush and Steele in Cardin's TV ads.  Steele focused on low taxes, less government spending, free markets and national security.

Despite polls days before the election showing the race at a 3% margin, Cardin won by more than 10% with a 178,295-vote margin. Steele conceded defeat at 9:02P.M. EST.

Massachusetts 

Incumbent Democrat Ted Kennedy won re-election to his ninth (his eighth full) term, beating Republican language school owner and activist Kenneth Chase. This was Kennedy's last election to the Senate.

At the Massachusetts Republican Party Convention Kenneth Chase received the official endorsement with a majority of delegates, though both candidates qualified for the September primary. Former White House Chief-of-Staff Andy Card also received 3 votes.

Kennedy captured every county in the state, winning at least 62% in each region.

Michigan 

Incumbent Democrat Debbie Stabenow won re-election to a second term, beating Republican Michael Bouchard, Oakland County Sheriff

Economic issues took front-and-center in the campaign, as Michigan's unemployment rate was one of the highest in the nation. In July 2006, unemployment in Michigan stood at approximately 7%, compared with a 4.7% rate nationwide. Pessimism about the state's economic future had left Michigan ranked 49th nationally between 2000 and 2005 in retaining young adults. Since its peak, Detroit had lost over a million people. Bouchard claimed that the incumbent had accomplished nothing, dubbing her "Do-Nothing Debbie." 

From a long way out Stabenow looked like she might be vulnerable. President Bush even came to Michigan to campaign for Bouchard, raising over $1,000,000 dollars for him. However Bouchard never won a single poll. By October the Republican Party, started taking resources out of Michigan to focus on closer races, essentially ceding the race to Stabenow. Stabenow would go on to win the election easily, capturing nearly 57% of the vote. Stabenow did well throughout Michigan, but performed better in heavily populated cities like Detroit, Lansing, Ann Arbor, and Kalamazoo. Bouchard did win Grand Rapids, a typical Republican area. He also won in many rural areas around the state. However Bouchard failed to put a dent in Stabenow's lead, largely due to her strong performance in heavily populated areas. Bouchard conceded to Stabenow at 9:58 P.M. EST.

Minnesota 

Incumbent DFL senator Mark Dayton decided in February 2005 that he would retire instead of seeking a second term. The primary elections took place on September 12, 2006. DFL nominee Amy Klobuchar won the open seat over Mark Kennedy (R), U.S. Congressman.

Klobuchar gained the early endorsement of the majority of DFL state legislators in Minnesota.

{{Election box begin no change
 | title      = Minnesota Democratic–Farmer–Labor primary<ref name="state.mn.us">  ]</ref>
}}

Kennedy's routine support of President George W. Bush in House votes was a central issue for Democrats in the campaign. In June 2006, allegations were made that many references to and photos of Bush had been removed from Kennedy's official U.S. House website; in rebuttal, Republicans said that there were 72 references to Bush on the website and that the changes noted by critics had been made some time ago, as part of the normal updating process. Ben Powers was the only ballot-qualified candidate not to be invited to appear on Minnesota Public Television's Almanac program, despite Mr. Powers's offer to fill the space left unfilled by Ms. Klobuchar's decision not to appear with Mr. Kennedy and Mr. Fitzgerald on the program. Green candidate Michael Cavlan appeared on the program twice during the 2006 campaign as a special guest.

 Mississippi 

Incumbent Republican Trent Lott won re-election to a fourth term.

Lott ran for re-election without facing any opposition in his party's primary. While it had been speculated that Lott might retire after his home was destroyed in Hurricane Katrina, he instead chose to run for re-election. Fleming is an African American, which represents 37% of the state's population. However, no African American has ever been elected to statewide office. The last black U.S. Senator was Hiram Revels, who was appointed and took office in 1870. Fleming got little help from the DSCC, which only donated $15,000 to his campaign.

 Missouri 

Incumbent Republican Jim Talent was elected in a special election in 2002 when he narrowly defeated incumbent Democrat Jean Carnahan. Carnahan had been appointed to the Senate seat following the posthumous election of her husband Mel Carnahan, who had died in a plane crash shortly before the 2000 election. Talent was running for a full term, his Democratic opponent was Missouri State Auditor Claire McCaskill. Early on the morning of November 8, Talent conceded defeat to McCaskill, having faced considerable political headwinds. Talent lost the election with 47% of the vote, to 50% of the vote for McCaskill.

The election was always expected to be very close, which seems fitting for a seat that has changed hands twice, both by very narrow margins, within the last six years. In 2000, the late Missouri Governor Mel Carnahan, a Democrat, narrowly defeated incumbent Republican Senator John Ashcroft 50% to 48%. Two years later in a special election held for the seat, incumbent Senator Jean Carnahan lost an even closer election to former Congressman Talent, 50% to 49%.

Missouri was seen as the nation's bellwether state throughout the 20th century: It had voted for the winner of every presidential election since 1900, except for 1956 (when the state narrowly favored Adlai Stevenson over Dwight D. Eisenhower). Missouri's bellwether status was due to the fact that it not only voted for the electoral victor, but that its returns usually mirrored national returns.

The state itself is a geographically central state, bordered by both the edges of Southern and Midwestern regions. In statewide contests for much of the 20th century, Missouri favored the Democratic Party. In recent elections, the Republican Party (GOP) has emerged in statewide contests. The election of 2004 was an important one; as George W. Bush was re-elected he carried Missouri. But this time his margin in the state was greater than it was nationwide. Bush won the Presidency 51% to 48%, he carried Missouri 53% to 46%. This trend had begun in 2000, when Bush lost the national popular vote to Al Gore 47% to 48% but still won Missouri, 50% to 47%. Bush's victory also saw Republicans triumph in several statewide contests; Senator Kit Bond was re-elected by a decisive 56% to 43% margin and Matt Blunt won the election for Governor, narrowly defeating state auditor Claire McCaskill 51% to 48%. The GOP also captured control of the state legislature for the first time in eighty years.

Talent, anticipating a tough re-election battle and attempting to dissuade challengers, had accumulated a large campaign fund. For most of 2005, he had no opposition. State Senator Chuck Graham had briefly entered the race early in the year, but dropped out soon after. However, on August 30, 2005, Democrat Claire McCaskill announced her intention to run for Talent's Senate seat.

McCaskill started with a large financial disadvantage, but she was also an experienced candidate with high name recognition. McCaskill had run two successful campaigns for state auditor. She was also a candidate for governor in 2004, when she defeated the incumbent Democratic Governor Bob Holden in the primary election but lost with 48% of the vote in the general election.

Both Talent and McCaskill faced unknowns in their respective primaries on August 8, 2006, and defeated them soundly.

The Missouri contest was seen as vitally important to control of the United States Senate; as a toss-up election between two strong candidates, the race was expected to attract a lot of interest as well as money spent on ads and turning out supporters. If Talent won, then a Democratic takeover of the U.S. Senate depended upon victories in Tennessee, where the Republican Bob Corker won, and Virginia, where Democrat Jim Webb won; the Democrats needed to win six seats to take control of the chamber with 51 seats. To do this, they would need to retain their 19 incumbent seats, win the four Republican-held seats of Montana, Ohio, Rhode Island, and Pennsylvania (where Democratic chances seemed above 50%, and Democrats won all 4.) and two of the following three "toss-up" races: Missouri, Tennessee and Virginia.

It is believed that statewide ballot issues drove the November 2006 vote. Talent was on the opposite of the majority of voters in this poll on just about every issue: 66% of Missouri voters favored raising the minimum wage to $6.50 an hour; 62% of Missouri voters favored raising taxes to replace Medicaid funding cut by the current Republican Governor, Matt Blunt; 54% opposed a law that would require all Missourians to show a photo ID before they vote; 58% favored campaign donation limitations; and 66% favored restoring Medicaid coverage to about 90,000 Missourians who lost coverage when Blunt and the Republican legislature tightened eligibility requirements.

Perhaps most importantly, 62% favored a ballot proposal that would allow all types of embryonic stem cell research allowed under federal law - a measure Talent had recently announced that he was against.

On election night the race was, as expected, too close to call. With 85% of the vote in and with still no call, McCaskill claimed victory. At the time McCaskill declared victory, she was ahead by a vote margin of 867,683 to Talent's 842,251 votes; in percentage terms, with 85% of the vote in, McCaskill led Talent, 49% to 48%. Finally, at 11:38 P.M. Central Time the Associated Press called McCaskill as the winner. St. Louis County, adjacent to St. Louis, and Jackson County, home of Kansas City, are probably what pushed McCaskill over the finish line.

 Montana 

Incumbent Republican Conrad Burns was running for re-election to a fourth term, but was defeated by Democrat Jon Tester, President of the Montana State Senate, by a margin of 0.87%, or 3,562 votes out of 406,505 votes.

Burns was first elected as a United States senator from Montana in 1988, when he defeated Democratic incumbent John Melcher in a close race, 51% to 48%. Burns was re-elected 62.4% to 37.6%, over Jack Mudd in the Republican Revolution year of 1994. In 2000, Burns faced the well-financed Brian Schweitzer whom he beat 50.6% to 47.2%.

In 2000, George W. Bush carried Montana 58% to 33% in the race for President, but Burns won by 3.4%. Since the direct election of Senators began in 1913, Burns is only the second Republican Montana has elected to the U.S. Senate. Also, for thirty-two straight years, 1952 to 1984, Montana elected only Democratic Senators.

Burns's involvement in the Jack Abramoff scandal made him vulnerable. A SurveyUSA poll released in March 2006 found that 38% of Montanans approved of him, while 52% disapproved of him. Polls against leading Democratic candidates had him below his challengers.

On May 31, 2006, Richards, citing the closeness of the race, and his own position (third) in the polls, withdrew from the race, and threw his support to Tester. Morrison started off strong in the race for the Democratic nomination for Senator, collecting $1.05 million as of the start of 2006, including $409,241 in the last three months of 2005. but Morrison's advantages in fundraising and name identification did not translate into a lead in the polls. Later, the race was called a "deadlock," but Tester continued to gather momentum.

The race was expected to be close, due to Burns's previous narrow winning margins and recent political scandal involving him personally; Republican incumbents everywhere were facing more challenging races in 2006 due to the waning popularity of Congress and the leadership of President George W. Bush. In July 2006, the Rasmussen report viewed Burns as the "second most vulnerable Senator seeking re-election this year (Pennsylvania's Rick Santorum was still the most vulnerable)."

Senator Conrad Burns of Montana faced a strong challenge from Brian Schweitzer in 2000, being re-elected by 3.4% in a state that went for Bush twice by margins of over 20%. This, combined with the increasing strength of the state Democratic party and accusations of ethical issues related to the Jack Abramoff scandal, made this a highly competitive race.

On July 27, Burns was forced to apologize after he confronted out of state firefighters who were preparing to leave Montana after helping contain a summer forest fire and directly questioned their competence and skill; Burns was strongly criticized.

On August 31, in a letter faxed to the office of Montana governor Brian Schweitzer, Burns urged the governor, a Democrat, to declare a fire state of emergency and activate the Montana Army National Guard for firefighting. Schweitzer had already declared such a state of emergency on July 11 — thus, activating the Montana Army National Guard. He issued a second declaration on August 11. A Burns spokesman said the senator was "pretty sure" Schweitzer had already issued such a disaster declaration, but just wanted to make sure. "The genesis of the letter was just to make sure that all the bases were covered," Pendleton said. "This is not a political football. It's just a cover-the-bases letter and certainly casts no aspersions on the governor."

Due to errors with polling machines the Montana count was delayed well into Wednesday November 8. The race was too close to call throughout the night and many pundits predicted the need for a recount. After a very close election, on November 9, incumbent Conrad Burns conceded defeat.

Just before 11:00 AM (MST) on November 8, Jon Tester was declared Senator-elect for Montana in USA Today. At 2:27 PM EST on November 8, CNN projected that Jon Tester would win the race.

Burns conceded the race on November 9, and congratulated Tester on his victory.

The race was the closest Senate election of 2006 in terms of absolute vote difference; the closest race by percentage difference was the Virginia senate election.

 Nebraska 

Incumbent Democrat Ben Nelson won re-election to a second term. As of 2021, this is the last Senate election in Nebraska won by a Democrat.

Republican Pete Ricketts, former COO of TD Ameritrade and future Governor of Nebraska financed his own campaign. His opponents could not raise enough money to keep up. Kramer raised $330,000 and Stenberg raised $246,000 in 2005.

The primary election was held May 9, 2006. Pete Ricketts won the Republican nomination with 48% of the vote. Ben Nelson was unopposed for the Democratic nomination. Nelson was elected in 2000 by a margin of 51% to 49% after serving as the state's governor for two terms. Nelson, considered the most conservative Democrat in the Senate, was the lone Democrat in Nebraska's Congressional delegation. This election was one of the most expensive in Nebraska history. In 2005, Ben Nelson raised $3.9 million for his re-election campaign. Pete Ricketts contributed $14.35 million of his own money to his campaign; he raised an additional $485,000 in contributions. The race also attracted national attention and generated several high-level campaign appearances. President George W. Bush appeared at a rally for Ricketts on November 5, 2006, in Grand Island, while then-U.S. Senator Barack Obama appeared at a fundraiser for Nelson and other Nebraska Democrats on May 5, 2006 in Omaha. However, he won re-election by a wide margin.

 Nevada 

Incumbent Republican John Ensign won re-election to a second term over Democrat Jack Carter, Navy veteran and son of President Jimmy Carter.

Popular Las Vegas mayor Oscar Goodman had said in January that he would probably run, but in late April, he decisively ruled that out. Goodman did not file by the May 12, 2006 deadline. Carter's advantages included his formidable speaking abilities and kinship with a former U.S. President. On the other hand, Ensign was also considered to be an effective speaker and as of the first quarter of 2006, held an approximately 5-1 advantage over Carter in cash-on-hand.

Ensign won a majority of the votes in every county in the state, with his lowest percentage at 53%.

 New Jersey 

Incumbent Democrat Bob Menendez was elected for a full term. The seat was previously held by Democratic Governor of New Jersey Jon Corzine. After Corzine resigned and was sworn in Governor, Corzine appointed Congressman Menendez on January 18, 2006. Menendez was challenged by Republican Thomas Kean, Jr. and seven other candidates. Filing for the primary closed on April 10, 2006. The primary election was held June 6, 2006.  Menendez became the first Hispanic to hold a U.S. Senate seat from New Jersey, and was the first Latino elected to statewide office in the state.

Menendez won the Democratic primary, with 86% of the vote, against James D. Kelly, Jr.

Republican John P. Ginty, associate director with Standard & Poor's represented the conservative wing of the New Jersey Republican party. Kean was a moderate, and the son of the former Governor of New Jersey Thomas Kean. Kean won the primary by a 3-1 margin.

The biggest factors in the New Jersey Senate race may have had little to do with the candidates involved and more to do with Governor of New Jersey Jon Corzine and President George W. Bush.

In mid-summer, Jon Corzine and the Democratic-controlled state legislature held a brief shutdown of state government, which ultimately resulted in a sales tax increase, among other things.

In a September 2006 poll, SurveyUSA found that Corzine received an approval rate of only 43%, with 48% of the state disapproving. Since Menendez had been appointed by Corzine, some pundits argued that this would be a resonating factor with a number of voters.

According to a separate September 2006 poll, SurveyUSA found that the state of New Jersey had a rather high disapproval rating for Republican President George W. Bush, with 64% disapproving and only 32% approving. This led some to argue that voters would take their discontent with Bush out on Kean in the November election.

Indeed, some pollsters demonstrated that concerns over the Iraq War and discontent with President Bush solidified the Democratic base in October's advertising blitz, and won over enough independents to seal of fate of the Republican nominee. On the eve of the election, Fairleigh Dickinson University's PublicMind Poll reported that 65% likely voters said that the US invasion of Iraq was a mistake, "including nine of ten Democrats and six of ten independents." Observers also pointed out that "from the beginning, [Menendez] made much of his 2002 vote against the Iraq War Resolution, often referring to it as one of the most important votes of his career. He made it clear as well that he intended to make the race a referendum on the President."

Others attributed Kean's early strong showing in the polls of this blue state to uninformed voters confusing the three-year state senator with his father, the popular former governor and 9/11 Commission chairman.

Because of Kean's perceived liberalism on social issues, he has been labeled by some conservatives as a "Republican in Name Only".

On June 13, 2006, Kean held a fundraiser in Ocean County featuring First Lady Laura Bush. It was here that both Senator Kean and Mrs. Bush pointed out that Kean is not George W. Bush, claiming that Senator Menendez seems to confuse the two.

On June 16, 2006 at a New Jersey Association of Counties speaking event in Atlantic City, Kean and his aides beat a hasty retreat from the ballroom engagement and "stampeded" into an elevator in an abortive attempt to avoid the press, only to exit on the same floor as they had entered. Kean declined to answer questions about the scathing attacks on his integrity which his opponent had delivered minutes earlier, instead opting to repeat "a few slogans."

In late June, the Associated Press reported that Kean's campaign was planning a "Swift Boat"-style film accusing Menendez of involvement in a New Jersey mob-connected kickback scheme "despite public records and statements disputing that claim."  The AP article noted that "[f]our former federal prosecutors who oversaw the case have said Menendez was never involved in any wrongdoing."  The airing of unsubstantiated  allegations years or even decades old is a hallmark of the Swift Boat Veterans for Truth campaign attack style, which gained notoriety during the 2004 U.S. presidential election.

In mid-September, The Star-Ledger reported that Sen. Menendez had declined a national debate with Kean on the popular Sunday morning talk-show, Meet the Press. A Menendez spokesperson stated that the incumbent Democrat would prefer to focus on local citizens and press. Menendez did agree to take place in three locally aired debates with Kean, which will be aired between October 7–17. Kean withdrew from one of the scheduled debates to which he had previously committed, an October 14, 2006, debate sponsored by the League of Women Voters, insisting on a national TV debate as a condition of his participation.

Both candidates agreed to participate in a virtual debate sponsored by the nonpartisan Hall Institute of Public Policy - New Jersey which provided "an unprecedented opportunity for candidates and citizens to engage in an interactive forum on the important issues confronting" New Jersey. Beginning in July and running through Election Day in November, the institute submitted questions to the candidates and then posted their responses on its website.

 New Mexico 

Incumbent Democrat Jeff Bingaman won re-election to a fifth term.

David Pfeffer, Santa Fe City Councilman announced on August 23, 2005, that he would be entering the primary. A former Democrat, he supported George W. Bush in 2004 and became a Republican in 2005. In his campaign announcement, Pfeffer focused mainly on border controls with Mexico. He criticised Bingaman in comparison to his own support for reform of the Social Security system and the Iraq War as well as U.S. relations with China, saying "With all due respect, I do not believe the present occupier of the junior seat from New Mexico is doing all that can and should be done on these fronts," he said of Bingaman. "I believe I can do a better job ... " Pfeffer also commented that he would have a hard time raising an amount equivalent to Senator Bingaman, a problem faced by any of the latter's potential challengers.

Bingaman had a 60% approval rating in one poll. He faced no primary opposition. There had been speculation that Bingaman would give up the chance to run for another term to become a lobbyist.

Bingaman won every county in the state with at least 56% of the vote.

 New York 

Incumbent Democrat Hillary Rodham Clinton won by a more than two-to-one margin. Clinton was challenged by Republican John Spencer, a former Mayor of Yonkers, New York.

Clinton spent $36 million for her re-election, more than any other candidate for Senate in the 2006 elections.

On November 7, 2006, Clinton won easily, garnering 67% of the vote to Spencer's 31%.  The election was not close, with Clinton winning 58 of New York's 62 counties. Clinton had a surprisingly strong performance in upstate New York which tends to be tossup. When Clinton's upstate margins combined with her huge numbers out of New York City, there was no coming back for the Republicans. Clinton was sworn in for what would be her last term in the senate serving from January 3, 2007 to January 21, 2009 when she assumed the office of United States Secretary of State.Percentages do not add to 100% due to rounding.Clinton and Spencer totals include their minor party line votes: Independence Party and Working Families Party for Clinton, Conservative Party for Spencer.In addition, 213,777 ballots were blank, void, or scattered, and are not included in the Turnout sum or percentages. North Dakota 

Incumbent Dem-NPL-er Kent Conrad won re-election to a fourth term, beating Republican farmer Dwight Grotberg.

Popular Republican governor John Hoeven was heavily recruited by prominent national Republicans, including Karl Rove and Dick Cheney to run against Conrad. SurveyUSA polls showed that both Conrad and Hoeven had among the highest approval ratings of any Senators and governors in the nation. A poll conducted by PMR (8/26-9/3 MoE 3.9) for The Forum of Fargo-Moorhead had as result for a hypothetical matchup: Hoeven-35%, Conrad-27%, Uncommitted-38%. This poll showed voter conflict between two very popular politicians in a small state where party loyalty is often trumped by personality. In late September 2005, Hoeven formally declined. Hoeven ran for the Senate in 2010 and was elected.

Conrad won at least 53% of the vote in every county in the state.

 Ohio 

Incumbent Republican Mike DeWine ran for re-election but lost to Democratic congressman Sherrod Brown.

DeWine had approval ratings at 38%, making him the second most unpopular U.S. Senator, behind Pennsylvania Republican Rick Santorum, who was also up for re-election in 2006. Pre-election stories in the U.S. media suggested that the national Republican Party may have given up on saving Senator DeWine's senate seat before election date. Sherrod Brown, former Ohio Secretary of State and U.S. Representative from Ohio's 13th district was the Democratic candidate, and the eventual winner.

Paul Hackett, Iraq War veteran announced on February 13, 2006 that he would withdraw from the race, because national party leaders had decided that Sherrod Brown had a better chance against DeWine. The Plain Dealer (2/18/06) also reported that there had been concerns that Hackett might not have had enough money after the primary to run the statewide advertising customary for a Senate campaign.

Both Republican challengers, engineer William G. Pierce and David Smith, candidate for OH-02 in 2005, campaigned as conservative alternatives to DeWine, citing DeWine's support for legal abortion and his role as one of the Republican members of the Gang of 14 who compromised with Democrats in a dispute about judicial appointments.  DeWine won the primary 71.82% of the votes.

Because this race was targeted by Democrats, it made it all the more important to the GOP, who desired to retain Senate control. John McClelland, a spokesman for the Ohio Republican Party said, "It's vitally important to the Republican Party as a whole, so I think that's why you see the president coming to Ohio to support Mike DeWine. Phil Singer, a spokesman for the Democratic Senatorial Campaign Committee said, "Mike DeWine Senior is in for the fight of his life, make no mistake about it".

On July 14, 2006, DeWine's campaign began airing TV commercials depicting a smoking World Trade Center. "The senator was notified ... by a reporter at U.S. News & World Report that the image of the burning Twin Towers could not have depicted the actual event because the smoke was blowing the wrong way." DeWine's campaign admitted that the video was actually a still photo of the World Trade Center with smoke digitally added. He also was criticized for using an emotionally charged image to attack his challenger.

Another of DeWine's ads suggested that opponent Sherrod Brown didn't pay his taxes for thirteen years. This claim led to the Associated Press reporting on October 19 that, "Several Ohio television stations have stopped airing a Republican ad because state documents contradict the ad's accusation that Democratic U.S. Senate candidate Sherrod Brown didn't pay an unemployment tax bill for 13 years." Brown produced a commercial citing these facts. DeWine's ads were changed to state only that he had failed to pay his unemployment taxes until legal action was taken against him.

According to an article in the October 16, 2006, edition of The New York Times, top Republican party officials on the national level determined that DeWine would probably be defeated and were moving financial support from his race to other Republican senatorial candidates they felt were more likely to win.

Brown was called the winner right when the polls closed at 7:30. DeWine had the second worst performance of a Republican incumbent in 2006. Only Rick Santorum in Pennsylvania had a worse performance. While DeWine was able to win rural counties in western Ohio, Brown managed to win most eastern Ohio counties, especially in heavily populated areas. DeWine's narrow 2,000 vote victory in Hamilton County which is home to Cincinnati, came nowhere close to making a dent in Brown's lead. Brown would go on to be re elected in 2012 and again in 2018.

 Pennsylvania 

Incumbent Republican Rick Santorum ran for re-election to a third term, but was defeated by Bob Casey, Jr. Casey was elected to serve between January 3, 2007 and January 3, 2013. Santorum trailed Casey in every public poll taken during the campaign. Casey's margin of victory (nearly 18% of those who voted) was the largest ever for a Democratic Senate nominee in Pennsylvania, and the largest margin of victory for a Senate challenger in the 2006 elections.

Bob Casey, Jr., State Treasurer, former State Auditor General and son of former Governor Bob Casey, Sr. won the Democratic primary.

Santorum was unopposed in the Republican primary.  Republican John Featherman, who ran against Santorum in 2000 as a Libertarian, had been expected to challenge him in the 2006 Republican primary. However, Featherman withdrew his candidacy after a GOP petition challenge because he did not have the necessary number of signatures to get on the ballot.

Republican strategists took as a bad omen Santorum's primary result in 2006, in which he ran unopposed for the Republican nomination. Republican gubernatorial nominee Lynn Swann, also unopposed in the primary, garnered 22,000 more votes statewide than Santorum in the primary, meaning thousands of Republican voters abstained from endorsing Santorum for another Senate term. This may have been partly due to Santorum's support for Arlen Specter, over Congressman Pat Toomey in the 2004 Republican primary for the U.S. Senate. Even though Santorum was perceived to be only slightly less conservative than Toomey, he joined virtually all of the state and national Republican establishment in supporting the moderate Specter. This led many socially and fiscally conservative Republicans to consider Santorum's support of Specter to be a betrayal of their cause. However, Santorum said that he supported Specter to avoid risking a Toomey loss in the general election, which would have prevented President George W. Bush's judicial nominees from getting through the Senate. Santorum said Supreme Court Justice Samuel Alito would not have been confirmed without the help of Specter, who was chairman of the Senate Judiciary Committee at the time.

At 9:45 PM EST on Election Night, Santorum called Casey to concede defeat.

 Rhode Island 

The election was won by Sheldon Whitehouse, former Attorney General of Rhode Island and former U.S. Attorney for the District of Rhode Island.  Republican Lincoln Chafee was seeking re-election for a second full term to the seat he had held since 1999, when he was appointed to fill the vacancy created by the death of his father John Chafee. Lincoln Chafee won election to the seat in 2000.

Whitehouse was endorsed by U.S. Senator Jack Reed, U.S. Congressmen Jim Langevin and Patrick J. Kennedy, as well as by former candidate Matt Brown. Carl Sheeler, a former U.S. Marine, a business owner, and an adjunct professor of business, ran on a more progressive platform. Ultimately, however, Whitehouse would trounce his competition in the primary on September 12, winning his party's support by a large margin.

Incumbent Lincoln Chafee was one of the most liberal members of the Republican Party in the Senate by 2006, and was challenged for the Republican nomination by Steve Laffey, Mayor of Cranston, who had criticized Chafee for his liberal voting record in the Senate. In early 2006, the Club for Growth, a pro-tax cut political action committee, sent a series of mailings to Rhode Island Republicans attacking Chafee's positions and voting record.

The national GOP supported Chafee in the primary campaign, believing that he was the most likely candidate to hold the seat in the general election. Senator Mitch McConnell of Kentucky, John McCain of Arizona and Laura Bush appeared at fundraisers for Chafee, while Senator Bill Frist's PAC donated to Chafee. The National Republican Senatorial Committee also ran ads in the state supporting Chafee. Steve Laffey, however, picked up many endorsements from Republican town committees throughout Rhode Island, the national group Club for Growth, and former candidate for the party's Presidential nomination Steve Forbes. On July 10, 2006, the National Republican Senatorial Committee filed a complaint with the Federal Election Commission against Laffey, saying that he had included a political communication in tax bills mailed to residents of Cranston.

Democrats believed that this was one of the most likely Senate seats to switch party control, due to the Democratic tilt of Rhode Island, as well as the fact that Chafee needed to expend part of his campaign fund to win the Republican primary election. Chafee's approval ratings also took a beating from his primary battle with Laffey and may have hurt him in the general election. Another factor that hurt Chafee was the fact that Whitehouse, the Democratic nominee, had a huge head start on him, as he was able to campaign with little opposition for at least half the year and had not had to contend with a major opponent until the general election campaign. Rhode Islanders' historically large disapproval ratings for President Bush and the Republican Party as a whole was another major hurdle for Chafee.

Whitehouse and Chafee very rarely disagreed on political issues. Socially, they agreed almost 100% of the time. Chafee was against the Bush tax cuts, indicating his ideology was liberal-leaning. On some fiscal issues they disagreed on such as on social security and free trade.

Whitehouse carried Providence County, which contains approximately 60% of the state's population, with 59% to Chafee's 41%. Chafee's strongest showing was in Washington County ("South County"), where he took 55% of the vote against Whitehouse's 45%. Chafee also took Kent County by a small margin, while Whitehouse was victorious by extremely slim margins in Bristol and Newport counties.

After the election, when asked by a reporter if he thought his defeat would help the country by giving Democrats control of Congress, he replied, "to be honest, yes."

 Tennessee 

Winner Bob Corker replaced Republican Bill Frist who retired upon the end of his second term in 2007. Corker was the Republican nominee, and the Democratic nominee was Harold Ford, Jr., U.S. Representative. The race between Ford and Corker was one of the most competitive Senate races of 2006, with Corker winning the race by less than three percent of the vote. Corker was the only non-incumbent Republican to win a U.S. Senate seat in 2006. Since 1994, the Republican Party has held both of Tennessee's Senate seats.

Ford is known nationally for his keynote address at the 2000 Democratic National Convention in Los Angeles, California, and for a challenge to Nancy Pelosi for leadership of the House Democrats. Rosalind Kurita, a six-term state Senator from Clarksville, Tennessee dropped out of the race in early April 2006. No official reason was given, but Ford enjoyed substantial support from Democratic leaders in Washington and Nashville and held a substantial lead in fundraising. Ford won the Democratic nomination by a wide margin in the primary.

Only 11 percent of Tennesseans knew who Corker was when he began running for the Senate race. All three Republicans had run statewide campaigns in the past, albeit unsuccessful ones: former U.S. Representative Ed Bryant for the 2002 Republican Senate nomination, losing to Lamar Alexander; businessman and former Mayor of Chattanooga Bob Corker for the U.S. Senate in 1994, losing to Frist in the Republican primary; and former U.S. Representative Van Hilleary for Tennessee Governor in 2002, losing to Democrat Phil Bredesen. Corker won the nomination by obtaining 48% of the primary vote to Bryant's 34% and Hilleary's 17%.

Not long after Corker's primary victory was assured, Ford, at a rally of his supporters attended by Bill Clinton, challenged Corker to seven televised debates across the state. In response, Corker said he will debate Ford but did not agree to Ford's request of seven debates.  Both of Corker's primary opponents endorsed Corker immediately after they conceded the race.

Before a Corker press conference in Memphis on October 20, Ford approached Corker in a parking lot and confronted his opponent about Iraq in front of local news cameras, pointing out that some of Corker's fellow Republicans are changing their minds on the war and wanting to debate him about the issue. In response, Corker said, "I came to talk about ethics, and I have a press conference. And I think it's a true sign of desperation that you would pull your bus up when I'm having a press conference."  Ford replied that he could never find Corker. Corker then walked away to his press conference.

On November 2, Nielsen Monitor Plus indicated that the Corker campaign had purchased more television advertising than any other Senate candidate in the country through October 15.

A particularly negative ad titled "Who Hasn't?" sponsored by the Republican National Committee ("RNC") that aired during the third and fourth weeks of October gained national attention and condemnation from both Ford and Corker. The ad portrayed a scantily clad white woman (Johanna Goldsmith) acting as a Playboy bunny who "met Harold at the Playboy party" and invites Ford to "call me".

Responding to questions about the ad, a Ford spokesperson said that Ford went to a 2005 Playboy-sponsored Super Bowl party that was attended by more than 3,000 people, and Ford himself said that he likes "football and girls" and makes no apology for either.

 Texas 

Incumbent Republican Kay Bailey Hutchison won re-election to a third term over Democratic attorney Barbara Ann Radnofsky.

The Democratic nominee who had never run for public office and was expected to face an uphill battle in the general election, especially in a state that has not elected a Democrat statewide since 1994 and against a historically popular Hutchison. Since neither Radnofsky nor her main opponent, Gene Kelly, had received a majority of votes in the Democratic primary, a runoff was held April 11, 2006, which Radnofsky won. Radnofsky's campaign platform is available on her website.  Scott Lanier Jameson won the Libertarian Party nomination at the party's state convention on June 10, 2006, defeating Timothy Wade and Ray Salinas. Arthur W. Loux, a Roman Forest City Councilman and a member of the Minutemen, was running as an independent.

Hutchison co-sponsored legislation supporting the creation of a constitutional amendment that would limit terms for senators, but had been quoted saying that she would only leave after two terms if such a law applied to all senators. After deciding not to challenge Governor Rick Perry this year, as had been widely speculated, Hutchison was running for a third term.  She had no opposition in the Republican primary, and had approval ratings in the 60 percent range going into the General Election , although they had been slipping rapidly.

 Utah 

Incumbent Republican Orrin Hatch won re-election to a sixth term over Democrat Pete Ashdown, the founder and CEO of Utah's oldest Internet service provider, XMission.

Hatch won all but one county with 60% to 70% of the vote. Ashdown won the remaining one county by 342 votes.

 Vermont 

Incumbent Independent Jim Jeffords decided to retire rather than seek re-election to a fourth term in office and Bernie Sanders was elected to succeed him over Republican businessman Richard Tarrant.

Sanders represented Vermont's at-large House district as an independent, won the Democratic primary and then dropped out to run as an independent. Many Democratic politicians across the country endorsed Sanders, and no Democrat was on the ballot. The state committee of the Vermont Democratic Party voted unanimously to endorse Sanders. Sanders won the open seat with 65% of the vote.

Four candidates ran in the Democratic primary.M.D. Drysdale, Primary Election Is Next Tuesday  (September 7, 2009). Herald. Sanders won the primary, but declined the nomination, leaving no Democratic nominee on the ballot. This victory ensured that no Democrat would appear on the general election ballot to split the vote with Sanders, an ally of the Democrats, who has been supported by leaders in the Democratic Party.

In mid-August 2006, the campaign heated up considerably, with Tarrant fully engaged in heavy media advertising, most of which criticized Sanders's public stances. Tarrant ran several ads accusing Sanders of representing himself differently from his voting record in the House of Representatives, citing such examples as Sanders's votes against Amber Alert and against increased penalties for child pornography. Sanders responded with an ad stating that Tarrant's claims are "dishonest" and "distort my record" and presented what he viewed as more accurate explanations of his voting record.

Sanders won a majority of the votes in every county in the state, with 57% as his lowest county total.

 Virginia 

Incumbent Republican George Allen ran for re-election to a second term, but lost in a narrow race to Democrat Jim Webb.

Allen, who previously served as Governor of Virginia and was considered a possible candidate for president in 2008, was running for his second term. Webb, a decorated Vietnam War veteran, writer and former Secretary of the Navy under Ronald Reagan won the Democratic nomination after being drafted by netroots activists, such as those at the blog Raising Kaine. Polls clearly favored Allen through mid-August, when he was caught on videotape on August 11 twice using an ethnic slur in reference to a Webb campaign volunteer, S.R. Sidarth, who is of Indian ancestry. Allen denied any prejudice in the comment, but his lead shrank considerably. Still, he led in most polls until late October, when several surveys showed Webb with a lead — mostly within the margin of error. The election was not decided until nearly 48 hours after the polls closed, when Allen, behind by a margin of about 0.3%, conceded on November 9, 2006. With all of the other Senate races decided, the outcome swung control of the Senate to the Democrats.

The week before the primary, businessman Harris Miller said a Webb campaign flier characterized him in an anti-Semitic way; Webb denied that it did.

Webb focused on his early and outspoken opposition to the war in Iraq, which Allen supported. In a September 4, 2002, opinion piece in The Washington Post, Webb wrote: "A long-term occupation of Iraq would beyond doubt require an adjustment of force levels elsewhere, and could eventually diminish American influence in other parts of the world." Webb's son, a U.S. Marine, served in Iraq.

Allen and Webb differed on other issues. Allen is anti-abortion; Webb supports abortion rights. Allen supported George W. Bush's tax cuts while Webb said more of the benefits should have gone to middle-class Americans. Both candidates supported the death penalty, right-to-work laws, and Second Amendment rights.

Virginia has historically been one of the more Republican Southern states: for instance it was the only Southern state not to vote for Jimmy Carter in 1976, its congressional delegation was mostly conservative, with eight of eleven Congressmen and both Senators belonging to the Republican Party prior to the 2006 election. This made Virginia's Congressional delegation the most Republican of any Southern state. Despite this, Democrats had won the previous two gubernatorial races, in 2001 and 2005. The state's political majority has been changing from conservative white to a mixture of races, especially Hispanic. The state is increasingly diverse; it had the highest percentage of Asians (4.7%, according to the 2005 American Community Survey of the U.S. census) of any Southern state. 9.9% of Virginians are foreign-born.
Webb, like Governor Tim Kaine in 2005, won the four major fast-growing counties in Northern Virginia outside Washington, D.C.; Fairfax, Loudoun, Prince William and Arlington. President Barack Obama carried Virginia by a 6.3% margin over Republican Senator John McCain.

When results began coming in, Allen quickly built a sizeable lead, which began to narrow as the night went on. With 90% of precincts reporting, Allen held a lead of about 30,000 votes , or about 1.5%. However, as votes began to come in from population-heavy Richmond, Webb narrowed the gap, and pulled ahead within the last 1 or 2% of precincts to report. Preliminary results showed Webb holding a lead of 8,942 votes, and many news organizations hesitated to call the election for either candidate until the next day. At 8:41 PM EST on November 8, AP declared Webb the winner.
In all Virginia elections, if the margin of defeat is less than half of a percentage point, the Commonwealth of Virginia allows the apparent losing candidate to request a recount, paid for by the local jurisdictions. If the margin of defeat is between one and one-half of a percentage point, the losing candidate is still entitled to request a recount, but must cover its expense.
Because the difference was less than 0.5%, George Allen could have requested a recount paid for by the government, but declined to make such a request. That was likely because:
 Even in large jurisdictions, recounts — such as those in Florida in 2000 and Washington's 2004 gubernatorial election — rarely result in a swing of more than 1,000 votes, and Allen was trailing by almost 10,000 in the initial count. In particular, almost all votes in this Virginia election were cast using electronic voting machines, whose results are unlikely to change in a recount.
 There was wide speculation that calling for a recount (and still losing) would give Allen a "sore loser" label, which would hurt his future election campaigns, including what some speculated might still involve a 2008 presidential run. However, after losing the senatorial election, on December 10, 2006, Allen announced that he would not be running for president in 2008.

 Washington 

Incumbent Democrat Maria Cantwell won re-election to a second term.

The filing deadline was July 28, 2006, with the primary held September 19, 2006. Cantwell consistently led in polling throughout the race, although political analysts saw her as vulnerable this election cycle due to her extremely narrow win in 2000 and discontent among progressive voters. In November, The National Journal ranked Cantwell's seat as number 13 of the top 20 races to watch based on the likelihood of switching party control, and the third-highest Democratic seat likely to flip. However, in an election marked by discontent over the Republican leadership in D.C., Cantwell easily won by a 17% margin of victory.

Statewide politics in Washington had been dominated by the Democratic Party for many years. The governor, lieutenant governor, treasurer, state auditor, and insurance commissioner were all Democrats, while only secretary of state, attorney general, and commissioner of public lands were Republican. Of the nine representatives Washington sent to the House of Representatives, six were Democrats. Democrat Patty Murray was the state's senior senator. Cantwell won her initial election to the Senate in 2000 over Slade Gorton by 2,229 votes. Due to the closeness of that race, and the close gubernatorial contest between Democrat Christine Gregoire and Republican Dino Rossi in November 2004, many Republicans believed they had a strong chance of capturing Cantwell's seat in 2006.

On March 9, 2006, Aaron Dixon announced his decision to seek the Green Party's nomination for U.S. Senate, challenging Cantwell on her continued support for the U.S. presence in Iraq and the USA PATRIOT Act. On May 13, 2006, Mr. Dixon secured the party's nomination at the Green Party of Washington state's Spring Convention.

Initially, Cantwell had two challengers from within the Democratic primary, both of them taking strong stances against the Iraq war that brought attention to Cantwell's votes for the Iraq Resolution and against a timeline for withdrawal. Three other Democrats also entered the primary race.

On August 8, 2006, the incumbent Democratic Senator from Connecticut, Joe Lieberman, lost his primary race to challenger Ned Lamont by 52%-48%, and then ran as an Independent in the general election. A great deal of attention was focused on this race as an early barometer of both anti-incumbent and anti-war sentiment nationwide. Comparisons were made between Lieberman's troubles and Cantwell's re-election bid, citing Cantwell's vote in favor of the Iraq Resolution that led to the war, her refusal to say she regretted the vote, and her vote against a timetable for withdrawal.

Unlike Lamont's campaign, Cantwell's anti-war opponents' campaigns received much less funding and did not have the same support from the blogosphere that brought Lamont to prominence and improved his name recognition. Also, unlike Lieberman, Cantwell altered her position on the war during her campaign and criticized the Bush Administration for its conduct of the war. She also hired her most vocal anti-war primary opponent, Mark Wilson, at $8,000-a-month salary, a move that was described by political commentators as "buying out" the opposition (which she also allegedly attempted with other anti-war challengers Hong Tran and Aaron Dixon). The article noted that, despite the differences in exact circumstances, the Lieberman defeat also showed that voters were in an anti-incumbent mood, which could've created problems for Cantwell. This was supported by another P-I article that also noted that the primary loss of Lieberman and two House incumbents, Michigan Republican Joe Schwarz and Georgia Democrat Cynthia McKinney, on the same day indicated that there may have been a nationwide anti-incumbent trend.

Following the primary results, Cantwell endorsed Ned Lamont and McGavick responded by endorsing Senator Lieberman. The Dixon campaign released a statement criticizing Cantwell's "spin and vague rhetoric" on the war, and equating her current position to a pro-war stance similar to Lieberman's.

On August 14, less than a week after Lamont's win and nearly four years after the actual event, Cantwell for the first time said she would have voted against the authorization to use force in Iraq if she knew then what she knew in 2006. However, she did so only after hearing her opponent McGavick say that he would have voted against the authorization under those conditions. Cantwell has stated that she had no regrets for her vote in favor of the authorization and did not change that position.

On July 9, anti-war challenger Mark Wilson announced he would abandon his bid, endorse Cantwell, and take a paid position offered by Cantwell's campaign, one day after progressive activist and anti-war critic Dal LaMagna had been hired to be the Cantwell campaign's co-chair. Initially, Cantwell's campaign refused to state how much they were paying Wilson, but under pressure from the media, disclosed that he was receiving $8,000 per month, only slightly less than Cantwell's campaign manager Matt Butler, who earns $8,731 per month. The next day, Hong Tran received a call from LaMagna saying they would like her to join their campaign, in a context that she interpreted as a job offer, which she refused. Political commentators, including those at the Seattle Post Intelligencer and one at The Washington Times, expressed their views that Cantwell was attempting to eliminate the viable options anti-war Democrats had to voice their opinion on the war in the upcoming primary by having Wilson join her campaign and then soliciting Tran.

Wilson's supporters and journalists expressed surprise at his withdrawal from the race after a 16-month campaign, where he was a sharp critic of the incumbent Senator, who he referred to on his campaign website as a "free-trading corporate elitist" who "bought her seat", then "alienated and alarmed" her base. When asked by reporters if he still believed what he said about Cantwell during his primary bid, he stated: "I believed in it to a point in order to capitalize on what was already existent, which was a rift within the Democratic Party over the issue of the war." Both Dixon and Tran publicly doubted that Wilson's apparent change of heart was genuine, citing his paid position with the campaign and his initial refusal to disclose his salary.

On September 25, Joshua Frank reported that Dixon was alleging that he had been contacted twice in July by Mark Wilson, who implied that large donations to Dixon's non-profit organization, Central House, would be made if he were to withdraw his candidacy before filing. Dixon also claimed that Wilson was not the only Cantwell staffer to contact him, but declined to disclose who the other staff was. Dixon also made this claim on a Democracy Now! broadcast. David Postman of the Seattle Times contacted the Cantwell campaign about the allegations; their spokesperson didn't say it didn't happen, but stated that no one on the campaign had been authorized to speak to Dixon about his campaign. The campaign did not allow access to Wilson so he could respond as to whether the conversation took place. Other reporters also had trouble contacting Wilson; Susan Paynter of the Seattle P-I, in an article on his shunning of the media, noted that there had been a widespread assumption after Wilson's hire that the intent was to silence him and that his disappearance only reinforced this assumption, calling it "the political equivalent of a farm subsidy." Paynter also quoted Hong Tran as saying that the reaction to Wilson's initial appearances on the campaign trail after he had joined Cantwell were so negative that she was not surprised he disappeared.

On September 19, after her defeat in the Democratic primary, Hong Tran lamented to the Seattle Times of "how undemocratic the Democratic Party really is" saying the state Democratic party had tried to keep her from getting attention, forbidding her from putting up signs at Coordinated Campaign events and not giving her access to the state party voter rolls. Cantwell, whose campaign hired two of her early critics, had also refused to debate Tran. When asked before the primary whether she would endorse the senator if her primary bid proved unsuccessful, Tran had responded, "certainly not."

From the Washington Secretary of State

In early hypothetical matchups in 2005 compiled by conservative pollster Strategic Vision, Rossi led Cantwell. Republican leadership reportedly pleaded with Rossi to jump into the ring. Rossi declined.

Speculation next centered on Rick White (who had taken Cantwell's House seat in 1994), state GOP chair Chris Vance, former Seattle television reporter Susan Hutchinson, and former 8th district Congressional candidate and Republican National Committee member Diane Tebelius. None of those chose to enter the race. Republican leaders finally got behind former Safeco Insurance CEO Mike McGavick.

Cantwell was projected to be the winner right when the polls closed at 11:00 P.M. EST Time.

 West Virginia 

Incumbent Democrat Robert Byrd won re-election to a ninth term. He was sworn in on January 4, 2007.

Before the 2000 presidential election, West Virginia had been won by the Democratic nominee every time since 1932 (except for the Republican landslides of 1956, 1972, and 1984). In 2000, then Republican Governor George W. Bush of Texas won West Virginia's five electoral college votes over then Vice President Al Gore of Tennessee by a margin of 52-46. Also in the 2000 election, Republican Shelley Moore Capito, the daughter of Former West Virginia Governor Arch A. Moore, Jr., won a surprise victory over Democrat Jim Humphreys for West Virginia's 2nd Congressional District seat to the United States House of Representatives. She would become the first Republican in West Virginia to hold a Congressional office for more than one term since her father in 1969. Before these two major victories for national and West Virginia Republicans, it was difficult to find a Republican who could mount a formidable campaign against Democrats running for public office in West Virginia.

President Bush won West Virginia again in the 2004 presidential election over John F. Kerry, the Democratic junior Senator from Massachusetts by a margin of 56-43. Both Representative Alan Mollohan (D-1st District) and Representative Nick Rahall (D-3rd District) had more formidable challenges from Republicans when compared to 2000 and 2002. Republican Brent Benjamin defeated Democratic incumbent West Virginia Supreme Court of Appeals Justice Warren McGraw, and Republican Betty Ireland defeated liberal-Democrat Ken Hechler, a former congressman and secretary of state, for West Virginia Secretary of State.

Since 2000, the Republicans have gained seven net seats in both the West Virginia Senate and the West Virginia House of Delegates. However, the Democrats hold 60% of the seats in the Senate and 68% of the seats in the House.

Along with continued majorities in the legislature, Democrats have also had some other victories. Even though both Bush and Capito won their respective offices in 2000, Senator Byrd sailed to an eighth term with 78% of the vote over Republican David Gallaher. Senator John D. Rockefeller, IV, easily won a fourth term to the Senate in 2002 by a margin of 63-37 over Republican Jay Wolfe. In 2000, 2002, and 2004, both Representative Mollohan and Representative Rahall were re-elected by much stronger margins than Capito. In 2004, Republican Monty Warner failed to defeat Democratic West Virginia Secretary of State Joe Manchin for governor.

After the Republicans failed to win the governor's race, West Virginia Republican Committee Chairman Kris Warner, the brother of Monty, was put under pressure to resign his post; he did so in May 2005. Wheeling attorney Rob Capehart took his place. (Dr. Doug McKinney of Bridgeport now holds the post.) Another brother of Monty, Kasey, who was appointed by President Bush in 2001, was removed as the United States Attorney for the Southern District of West Virginia on August 1, 2005. No explanation has been given for his departure and First Assistant U.S. Attorney Charles T. Miller currently represents the district.

Both state and national Republicans chose Shelley Moore Capito as their first choice to challenge Byrd. Early polling showed Byrd with only around a ten-point lead. Capito had even met with National Republican Senatorial Committee (NRSC) Chairwoman Elizabeth Dole, whose husband, Bob Dole, served alongside Byrd as majority and minority leader in the Senate, to discuss a possible run. Despite party leaders pushing for her to run, on October 3, 2005, Capito announced she would seek a fourth term for her congressional seat rather than run against Byrd. She cited the negativity of a possible Byrd-Capito race as a reason for not running. Other reasons for Capito not running include the following: Capito's seat is widely considered safe; Capito is rising in House leadership; if Capito ran against Byrd, her seat could possibly have fallen back into the Democratic column; and Capito's large amount of contributions from former House Majority Leader Tom DeLay could be brought into question.

After Capito decided not to run, Republicans hoped to recruit Secretary of State Betty Ireland, the first woman elected to the executive branch of West Virginia. On October 27, 2005, however, Ireland announced she would not run against the eight-term senator. She said that the office of Secretary of State should not be used as a political stepping stone. Ironically, Joe Manchin held the office of Secretary of State during his campaign for governor.

Conservative columnist Robert Novak wrote in a September 24, 2005, article that Gale Catlett's, the former Head Coach of the West Virginia University Men's Basketball team, name had been floated around as a possible challenger to Byrd. Catlett had in fact talked to West Virginia Republican Committee Chairman Capehart about either running against Byrd or possibly Representative Mollohan. It was also reported that if Capito had run against Byrd, Catlett would seek her seat. However, on November 11, 2005, Catlett decided not to run against Senator Byrd or Representative Mollohan. (A side note: On November 12, 2005, Ohio County Delegate Chris Wakim (R) announced his intentions to run against Representative Mollohan.)

On January 11, 2006, TheHill.com reported that NRSC Chairwoman Dole met with John Raese, the 1984 Republican United States Senate candidate and 1988 Republican Gubernatorial primary-candidate to discuss a possible run for the nomination in May. Raese did file for the primary by the deadline of January 28, 2006.

Byrd was extremely popular as he had approval ratings in the low 60% range. Raese, a millionaire, self-financed his campaign. He spent campaign ads on attacking Byrd.

 Wisconsin 

Incumbent Democrat Herb Kohl won re-election to a fourth term.

|- class="vcard"
! style="background:#e9e9e9;"|
| class = "org" | Democratic Party
| class = "fn" | Other
| style="text-align:right;"| 335
| style="text-align:right;"| 0.09%
| style="text-align:right;"|

|-

|- class="vcard"
! style="background:#e9e9e9;"|
| class = "org" | Republican Party
| class = "fn" | Other
| style="text-align:right;"| 530
| style="text-align:right;"| 0.27%
| style="text-align:right;"|

Robert Lorge was the Republican candidate for the seat after being the only Republican candidate to file before the filing deadline on July 11, 2006. Despite receiving no money or support from the State or National Republican Republican party he fared better than Republican Senate candidates in New York, Massachusetts, North Dakota, and was the only major party candidate in 2006 able to deliver votes for under $1 in the Post McCain-Feingold Campaign Finance Law era.

Kohl won a majority in every county in the state. Kohl's weakest performance in the state was suburban Washington County, Wisconsin, which Kohl won with just 49.6%. Kohl's strongest performance was in rural Menominee County, where he won with over 90% of the vote. Vogeler's best performance was in Dane County, where she came in third place with over 5%, a county where Lorge had his second weakest performance.

 Wyoming 

Incumbent Republican Craig Thomas won re-election to a third term. Thomas died 5 months into his term on June 4, 2007 after battling leukemia.

Thomas was a very popular two term incumbent, having a 68% approval rating. Despite doing very well in the polls, Thomas agreed to a debate. An October debate was sponsored by the Casper Star-Tribune and KCWY in Casper. Thomas said the nation has made progress in its energy policy, while Groutage said the nation's energy policy has failed because Congress has done more for special interests than the people.

Thomas won at least 56% of the vote in every county in Wyoming.

See also
 2006 United States elections
 2006 United States gubernatorial elections
 2006 United States House of Representatives elections
 109th United States Congress
 110th United States Congress

 Further reading 
 Orey, Byron D'Andra. "Racial Threat, Republicanism, and the Rebel Flag: Trent Lott and the 2006 Mississippi Senate Race," National Political Science Review July 2009, Vol. 12, pp. 83–96

 Notes 

External links
 United States Election 2006 Web Archive from the U.S. Library of Congress
 New York Elections Website
 Sample New York State ballot
 Rhode Island Election Results
 Democrats' Senate Hopes May Ride on Tennessee, by Robin Toner, The New York Times, May 31, 2006
 Dems pin hopes on candidate who's no liberal, by Zachary Coile, San Francisco Chronicle, September 17, 2006
 Senate race is looming large, by Rebecca Ferrar, Knoxville News-Sentinel, September 24, 2006
 New Hope for Democrats in Bid for Senate, by Robin Toner, The New York Times, September 28, 2006
 A photo finish in Corker-Ford race?, by Richard Locker, The Commercial Appeal, October 1, 2006
 Bob Corker's questionnaire responses from The Commercial Appeal Harold Ford Jr's questionnaire responses from The Commercial Appeal The Green Papers link on the Texas Midterm Election
 Vermont Secretary of State's Draft list of candidates (Excel spreadsheet). (Final version due to be released on July 24, 2006).
 Meet the Press with Allen and Webb: debate video excerpts, and debate transcript
 2006 Voter's Guide by the League of Women Voters of Virginia
  Updated every 2 minutes.
 Maps & graphic displays of the 2006 Virginia election results @ www.VaElection.org
 Televised Debate between Cantwell, McGavick, and Guthrie
 Washington Secretary of State's listing of candidates who have filed for office
 Results of previous elections in Washington State
 Washington Secretary of State
 JoinCalifornia 2006 General Election
 SmartVoter.org page on the California Senate race.
 State of Connecticut Secretary of State: 2006 Primary and Election Information
 State of Connecticut Secretary of State: Statement of Vote
 
   Topic: Primary results''
 Full list of U.S. Senate Candidates in Minnesota - From E-Democracy.Org
 Election results
 "Montana Senator in Fight of Political Life," Associated Press, October 15, 2006
 Election Results

References